Morena Dam is a rockfill dam across Cottonwood Creek, a tributary of the Tijuana River, in southern San Diego County, California in the United States. It is one of the few facilities in the San Diego water supply system that relies entirely on local runoff.

There is a small lakeside settlement just east of Morena Reservior called Morena Village. It makes up part of the census-designated place (CDP) of Campo.

Dimensions
Altogether the dam contains  of earth and rock fill. At its full height, the reservoir can hold  of water, covering .

Usage
Morena Reservoir, also known as Lake Morena, serves primarily for long-term storage of winter flood flows in Cottonwood Creek, and is the uppermost of a chain of three reservoirs – Lower Otay, Barrett and Morena – that provide water to the city of San Diego. From Lower Otay Reservoir the water enters the Otay Water Treatment Plant, before flowing into the municipal water network. The entire project is known as the Cottonwood-Otay Water System.

Originally providing the city's main water supply, it was relegated to a secondary role after the city began importing water from the Colorado River in 1939. The reservoir now provides a backup water supply that is drawn down during dry years, when stored local water provides a much cheaper alternative than imported water – costing $240 per acre-foot whereas Colorado River water typically costs about $800 per acre-foot. On average, Morena provides only about 3 percent of the city's total supply.

As Morena Reservoir has a larger surface area and thus greater evaporative losses than Barrett Lake, the city generally prioritizes storage in Barrett. Water is moved downstream from Morena as often as possible, if storage space is available in the lower reservoir. In addition, the watershed above Morena generally does not produce enough runoff to fill the reservoir, except in very wet years. As a result, Morena only reaches spillway level about once per decade.

History
The dam was first proposed in the 1880s by the Southern California Mountain Water Company, which envisioned a system of reservoirs and connecting pipelines to transport water from the Tijuana and Otay river basins to San Diego. A bond issue was approved in 1896 for construction of the Morena Dam, which would form the highest and most remote of the reservoirs. Construction began in fall 1896, directed by San Diego city engineer Edwin Capps. The initial construction was fraught with problems caused by leakage and poor engineering, and work stopped in April 1898. It was not until May 1909 when construction resumed, under engineer Michael O'Shaughnessy. The job was finally finished in 1912, at a cost of about $1.5 million.

The city of San Diego purchased the dam from Mountain Water Company in 1914. The spillway was rebuilt and widened in 1946 to increase its safety margin in floods.

Because the dam was built in a high mountain area with some of the highest annual rainfall in San Diego County, it was anticipated that its reservoir would fill every year. However, the early 1900s saw continuous drought conditions in Southern California, and the reservoir did not fill to more than a third of its capacity in the first few years of operations. It was not until 1916 (see below) when Morena reached capacity for the first time.

The "Rainmaker"
In 1916 the city of San Diego hired Charles Hatfield, a man known as the "Rainmaker", who had offered to fill Morena Reservoir at a cost of $10,000. Although the city council doubted his ability, Hatfield was hired and set to work "rainmaking" on January 1. By January 10, flooding rains began to fall throughout San Diego County. Rising at a peak rate of two feet (0.6 m) per hour, Morena Reservoir filled and spilled on January 26, a mere  from the top of the dam. In the rest of the county, flooding washed out bridges, inundated neighborhoods and killed over 50 people. The city subsequently deemed the rains an "act of God" and determined that if Hatfield were to collect the fee for filling Morena reservoir he would also have to pay for the damages caused by the rains. Hatfield never took the money.

References

External links
Daily water levels table for Morena and other San Diego County lakes

Dams in California
Dams completed in 1912
Rock-filled dams
United States local public utility dams
1912 establishments in California